Cheboksarsky District (Şupaşkar rayonĕ) is an administrative and municipal district (raion), one of the twenty-one in the Chuvash Republic, Russia. It is located in the north of the republic and borders with the Mari El Republic in the north, Mariinsko-Posadsky District in the east, Tsivilsky and Krasnoarmeysky Districts in the south, and with Morgaushsky District in the west. Its administrative center is the urban locality (an urban-type settlement) of Kugesi. Population:

Geography
The Volga River parts the district into a smaller area in the north and a larger southern area which contains the majority of the population.

History
The district was established on September 5, 1927.

Notable residents 

Hyacinth (born Nikita Bichurin; 1777–1853), one of the founding fathers of Russian Sinology
Mikhail Ignatyev (1962–2020), politician

References

Notes

Sources

Districts of Chuvashia